Ancheri is a residential area situated in the City of Thrissur in Kerala state of India. Ancheri is Ward 25 of Thrissur Municipal Corporation.

References

See also
Thrissur
Thrissur District

Suburbs of Thrissur city